Bromelia binotii is a plant species in the genus Bromelia. This species is endemic to Brazil.

References

binotii
Flora of Brazil